"Rise" is a song recorded by American singer Danny Gokey for his fourth album of the same name. The song is the title track and lead single from the album. Rise became Gokey's third No. 1 song on Billboard Christian Airplay chart. According to Gokey, the song is about how he overcame depression a few years prior to the song release.

Charts

References 

2017 songs
2017 singles
Danny Gokey songs
Songs written by Danny Gokey
BMG Rights Management singles